West Swan is an electoral district of the Legislative Assembly in the Australian state of Western Australia. It is located in the north-eastern suburbs of Perth.

West Swan was considered a safe Labor seat at its creation, but after a redistribution prior to the 2017 state election became notionally Liberal. After its creation prior to the 2008 election, ABC electoral commentator Antony Green calculated a theoretical margin of 10.6% favouring Labor Party over the Liberal Party in two party preferred terms. Rita Saffioti won the seat in 2008, holding it again with a margin of 1.9 points after the 2013 election. A redistribution in 2015 saw the seat with a notional 0.9 point Liberal margin, however Saffioti retained the seat at the 2017 election which saw a large swing to Labor.

Geography
The roughly oblong-shaped district is dominated by the bushland of Whiteman Park and Cullacabardee. The voters of West Swan are situated towards the eastern, southern and western edges of the district. To the north-west is the suburb of Landsdale. To the south lies Ballajura, Malaga and part of Beechboro. The suburbs of Henley Brook and West Swan lie to the west; whilst Caversham is situated in the south-west corner of the district.

History
West Swan was first contested at the 2008 state election. It was a new seat created as a result of the one-vote-one-value reforms. A majority of the new district's voters came from the abolished district of Ballajura; with the remainder drawn in from Bassendean, Wanneroo and Swan Hills.

Members for West Swan

Election results

References

External links
 
 

Electoral districts of Western Australia
Constituencies established in 2008
2008 establishments in Australia